Alan Favell (born 6 June 1960) is an Australian cricketer. He played one first-class match for South Australia in 1983/84.

See also
 List of South Australian representative cricketers

References

External links
 

1960 births
Living people
Australian cricketers
South Australia cricketers
Cricketers from Adelaide